Florin "Flocea" Marin (born 19 May 1953) is a Romanian football manager and a former football defender. Marin has a total of 456 matches as a manager in the Romanian top-division, Divizia A consisting of 166 victories, 103 draws and 187 losses.

Honours

Player
Rapid București
Cupa României (1): 1974–75
Steaua București
Liga I (1): 1977–78
Cupa României (1): 1978–79

Manager
Ceahlăul Piatra Neamț
Liga II (1): 2008–09

References

External links

1953 births
Living people
Footballers from Bucharest
Romanian footballers
Association football defenders
Romania under-21 international footballers
Liga I players
Liga II players
FC Rapid București players
FC Steaua București players
FC Argeș Pitești players
FC Gloria Buzău players
Romanian football managers
FCV Farul Constanța managers
CSM Ceahlăul Piatra Neamț managers
FC Progresul București managers
AFC Rocar București managers
FC U Craiova 1948 managers
FC Dinamo București managers
FC Astra Giurgiu managers
FC Petrolul Ploiești managers
CSM Jiul Petroșani managers
CS Mioveni managers
ASC Oțelul Galați managers
FC Rapid București managers
ACS Poli Timișoara managers